Bisterschied is a municipality in the Donnersbergkreis district, in Rhineland-Palatinate, Germany. Bennhausen has an area of 5.16 km² and a population of 232 (as of December 31, 2020).

References

Municipalities in Rhineland-Palatinate
Donnersbergkreis
Palatinate (region)